Paul Cambo (1908–1978) was a French stage and film actor.

Selected filmography
 Ramuntcho (1938)
 The Chess Player (1938)
 Sing Anyway (1940)
 The Village of Wrath (1947)
Your Turn, Callaghan (1955)
 Napoleon II, the Eagle (1961)
 La Course à l'échalote (1975)

References

Bibliography 
 Goble, Alan. The Complete Index to Literary Sources in Film. Walter de Gruyter, 1999.

External links 
 

1908 births
1978 deaths
French male film actors
French male stage actors